Mohammed Assiri (born 18 October 1992) is a Saudi Arabian football player who currently plays for Al-Taraji as a goalkeeper.

Club career

Al-Qadisiyah
In 2013, Assiri joined Al-Qadisiyah. He played his debut against Al-Ahli on 15 October 2016, which they lost 2-0. On 21 October 2016, he played his second match in the league against Al-Batin F.C., which the drew 1-1. His last match of the 2016-17 was against Al-Faisaly, which Al-Qadisiyah lost 3-2. On 11 August 2017, Assiri won his first match ever against Al-Raed 2-1.

References

External links
 

Living people
1992 births
Association football goalkeepers
Saudi Arabian footballers
Al-Qadsiah FC players
Al Batin FC players
Al-Thoqbah Club players
Al-Adalah FC players
Al-Sahel SC (Saudi Arabia) players
Al-Taraji Club players
Saudi First Division League players
Saudi Professional League players
Saudi Second Division players